The Pastels are an indie rock group from Glasgow formed in 1981. They were a key act of the Scottish and British independent music scenes of the 1980s, and are specifically credited for the development of an independent and confident music scene in Glasgow. The group has had a number of members, but currently consists of Stephen McRobbie, Katrina Mitchell, Tom Crossley, John Hogarty, Alison Mitchell and Suse Bear.

History

Formation 

The group formed in 1981 amid the peak of the Postcard Records era of independent music in Glasgow. Brian Taylor, a friend at the time of Postcard's Alan Horne, recruited McRobbie, Hayward, and Simpson for his new band. The band first performed at Bearsden Burgh Hall, booked by McRobbie after he attended a Crass gig at the same venue.

The band released their first single, "Songs for Children," on Whaam! Records in 1982, followed by their tape "Entertaining Edward" that same year on Action Tapes.

The band released a series of singles from 1982–1986, starting with "Something Going On" and B-side "I Wonder Why" in 1983. The latter record was later separately released by Rough Trade after McRobbie travelled to see Geoff Travis at the label's office in London, where he insisted that they were "the next big thing out of Scotland." The band then released "Million Tears" in 1984, "I'm Alright With You" in 1985, and "Truck Train Tractor" in 1986, all on other labels after their relationship with Rough Trade declined as the label focused  more heavily on their other artists such as "shinier new signings" Scritti Politti and the Smiths.

These releases were published on a variety of labels including Whaam!, Creation, and Glass Records, and all had a raw and immediate sound, melodic and amateur, which seemed at odds with the time.

Despite their contrarian musical approach, they soon enjoyed an emerging fanzine culture identified with the group's sound and image, and slowly started to influence a new wave of groups, as well as gathering the attention of NME and other UK media. Prior to their breakout album, the band appeared in a John Peel session, as well as a variety of zines. McRobbie at this period undertook a master's degree in librarianship at Glasgow University, which would ensure the band remained rooted in Glasgow during their newfound fame.

The Pastels' sound continued to evolve and, although part of NME's C86 compilation, in interviews they always sought to distance themselves from both twee and shambling developments.

Up for a Bit with the Pastels 
Their debut album, Up for a Bit with The Pastels (Glass, 1987; re-issue Paperhouse, 1991) moved from garage pop-punk through to ballads with synth orchestra splashes. The album launched to industry praise, with praise from acts including Jesus and Mary Chain, Primal Scream, Sonic Youth, Yo La Tengo, and Nirvana's Kurt Cobain, but the record did not "set the world alight" as some had expected. In 2003, it was named the 37th best Scottish album by The Scotsman. The Guardian describe the album as integral in helping "to inspire confidence in the Glasgow scene (showing) that bands didn’t have to move south but could let the record industry come to them." The album is attributed by the paper as attributable to the later release of Glaswegian output including Belle and Sebastian's Tigermilk, Mogwai's Young Team, Franz Ferdinand's self-titled arrival, and even Chvrches.

Departures and Sittin' Pretty 
The band's 1989 follow-up, Sittin' Pretty (Chapter 22, 1989) was harder but less eclectic. Reports started to appear in the UK music press that the group was splitting up, and Taylor, Hayward and Simpson all departed.

Eventually it became clear that a new line-up was configuring around original members, McRobbie and Wright (Aggi), now joined by Katrina Mitchell. This line-up is probably the best known of The Pastels' various phases, and often featured either David Keegan (of Shop Assistants) or Gerard Love (of Teenage Fanclub) on guitar. They signed with the then emerging Domino Records and completed two albums, Mobile Safari (1995) and Illumination (1997), with the musical approach of the latter described as "mellowed and evolved into a form of gently psychedelic off-kilter pop, adorned with orchestral instrumentation." A remix set featured My Bloody Valentine, Jim O'Rourke and others on the album, Illuminati (1998). The band also featured that year on the soundtrack for the film The Acid House.

In 2000, Wright left the group to focus on her career as an illustrator though she still provides artwork for the group. Their next release was the soundtrack to David Mackenzie's The Last Great Wilderness (Geographic, 2003). It featured a track recorded in collaboration with Pulp's Jarvis Cocker. In 2006 The Pastels developed and completed new music for a theatre production by Glasgow-based company, 12 Stars.

During the early 2000s the band continued to receive attention, particularly in Japan where they became "incongruously wrapped up in the hype surrounding Britpop in Japan, jostling for position in magazines with the likes of Blur and Manic Street Preachers."

In 2009, The Pastels, in collaboration with Tenniscoats from Tokyo, Japan, released an album called Two Sunsets, which critics called "a playful, spontaneous and spellbinding must-hear."

In 2013 they released their first album proper in sixteen years, Slow Summits, again through Domino. The Guardian described the album as "their most complete set since Up for a Bit, with its 10 summery, groovy flute and french-horn-licked songs, trippy in the sense of the kind of trip that lands in a pile of freshly mown grass." The album was shortlisted for the 2013 Scottish Album of the Year Award.

The band was featured in the 2017 documentary entitled Teenage Superstars.

The Pastels now operate their own Geographic Music label through Domino, and are partners in Glasgow's Monorail Music shop.

Band members

Current
 Stephen McRobbie (or Stephen Pastel) – guitar, vocals (1981–present)
 Katrina Mitchell – drums, vocals, guitar, keyboards (1989–present)
 Tom Crossley – flute, keyboards (1990s–present)
 Alison Mitchell – trumpet (2003–present)
 John Hogarty – guitar (late 2000s–present)
 Suse Bear – bass (2010s–present)

Former
 Brian Taylor (or Brian Superstar) – guitar (1981–1992)
 Martin Hayward  – bass, vocals (1982–1990)
 Bernice Simpson – drums (1983–1990)
 Annabel Wright (or Aggi) – vocals (1984–2000), keyboards (1984–1990), bass (1990–2000)
 Eugene Kelly – backing vocals, violin, guitar, autoharp (1987–1989)
 David Keegan – guitar (1992–2000)
 Gerard Love – guitar / bass 
 Jonathan Kilgour – guitar (1994–1997)
 Norman Blake – guitar, bass

Contributors
 Gerard Love – guitar, bass guitar, drums
 Norman Blake – guitar, bass guitar, vocals
 Colin McIlroy – guitar
 Charlie Dinsdale – drums
 Chris Gordon – drums
 Michael Giudici – bass guitar
 Sandy Forbes – drums
 Dean Wareham – guitar
 Maureen McRoberts – saxophone
 Darren Ramsay – trumpet
 Francis MacDonald – drums
 Liz Dew – bass

Discography

Studio albums
 Up for a Bit with The Pastels (1987)
 Sittin' Pretty (1989)
 Mobile Safari (1995)
 Illumination (1997)
 Slow Summits (2013)

Compilation albums
 Suck On (1988)
 Truckload of Trouble (1994)
 Illuminati (1998)
 Summer Rain (2013)

Soundtracks
 The Last Great Wilderness (2003)

Singles

With Jad Fair
 Jad Fair and The Pastels – This Could Be the Night EP (Paperhouse, 1991)
 Jad Fair and The Pastels – No. 2 EP (Paperhouse, 1992)

With Tenniscoats
 The Pastels and Tenniscoats – Two Sunsets (Geographic, 2009)
 The Pastels and Tenniscoats – Vivid Youth / About You (Geographic, 2009)

With Sonic Youth 
 The Pastels and Sonic Youth – Sonic Youth and the Pastels Play The New York Dolls (Glass Modern, 2021)

See also 
 Culture in Glasgow
 Music of Scotland
 Creation (record label)
 Glass Records
 C86 compilation
 NME

References

External links
 
 

Scottish rock music groups
Musical groups from Glasgow
Creation Records artists
Scottish indie rock groups
Scottish alternative rock groups
Musical groups established in 1982
British indie pop groups
Jangle pop groups
Scottish post-punk music groups
Scottish art rock groups
Glass Records artists
1982 establishments in Scotland
Homestead Records artists